The 2014 FIA European Touring Car Cup was the tenth running of the FIA European Touring Car Cup. It consisted of five events in France, Slovakia, Austria, Belgium and Italy. The championship was split into three categories: Super 2000 for TC2 Turbo and TC2 machinery, Super 1600, and the Single-Make Trophy for cars such as the SEAT León Supercopa.

In the Super 2000 class, TC2 Turbo honours were taken by Nikolay Karamyshev, who won six of the season's races. He won the championship by 10 points ahead of Maťo Homola, while Igor Skuz finished in 3rd position, taking 2 victories. Mikhail Grachev was the only other driver to take a class victory, at the Slovakia Ring. For normally-aspirated cars, the TC2 class saw Petr Fulín take the honours; he won seven races and finished the other three races on the podium. He finished 44 points ahead of his nearest challenger Michal Matějovský, who took a win at the Salzburgring. Third place in class was taken by Peter Rikli; other race victories were taken by Christian Fischer and Norbert Kiss, the latter taking an overall win at the Slovakia Ring.

In the Super 1600 class, six successive victories for Gilles Bruckner saw him overhaul Ulrike Krafft for class honours, despite missing the opening round of the season at Le Castellet. Krafft won the other four races during the season, before a scoreless round at Spa-Francorchamps stunted her progress for the title. With five second-place finishes, Christian Kranenberg finished in third place. Dmitry Bragin won the Single-Makes Trophy, after achieving two victories as well as two second-place finishes at the double-points finale at Enna. Second place went to Andreas Pfister, who also won two races, while four-time race winner Aku Pellinen finished in third place. The only other driver to take a class win was Norbert Nagy, who won both races at Enna in a one-off appearance; he had previously competed in the TC2 class at the first two meetings.

Teams and drivers

Race calendar and results

Championship standings

Super 2000 / Super 1600

Single-makes Trophy

† — Drivers did not finish the race, but were classified as they completed over 90% of the race distance.

Footnotes

References

External links

European Touring Car Cup
European Touring Car Cup
Touring Car Cup